Moses McCure Strong (May 20, 1810July 20, 1894) was an American lawyer, politician, businessman, and Wisconsin pioneer.  He was one of the framers of the Constitution of Wisconsin, a member of the territorial legislature, and United States Attorney for the Wisconsin Territory under President Martin Van Buren.  After Wisconsin achieved statehood, he was Speaker of the Wisconsin State Assembly during the 3rd Wisconsin Legislature.

Biography

Strong was born in Vermont in 1810, the son of Moses Strong, a Vermont lawyer and judge.  The younger Strong graduated from Dartmouth College in 1829, received a legal education, and practiced law in Rutland, Vermont.

Strong moved to Mineral Point, Wisconsin Territory, in 1836, where he was appointed deputy land surveyor.  When in Wisconsin, he secured an investment of $33,000 for land speculation from three New Hampshire financiers: Senator Henry Hubbard, Horace Hall, and George Olcott. By the end of 1837, Strong had acquired thousands of acres of land throughout the state: forty lots in the future Madison, Wisconsin; land in Dane County on the Wisconsin River which he called "St. Lawrence"; and land in the village of Arena. But when the Panic of 1837 hit, it became impossible to resell any of the land at a profit, and the investors for the most part lost their money.

In February 1837, James Duane Doty hired Strong to survey Madison and stake out the land for the Wisconsin State Capitol.

In June 1838, Strong was selected United States Attorney of the Territory of Wisconsin, and in December was appointed "fiscal agent" for the territory. In 1841, Strong was elected to the Council of the Legislative Assembly of the Territory of Wisconsin, representing Iowa County. He was reelected every year until 1846. His fellow councilmen elected him President of the Council in 1842 and 1845.

In 1846, Strong was selected to represent Iowa County in the first convention to draft a constitution for the future state of Wisconsin. (This draft was rejected by the people in 1847.)  The Constitutional Convention's journal recorded Strong's opposition to black suffrage, with Strong noting that he "was a friend to females, and it was for that reason he did not wish to see them tacked on to negroes." Later in the debate, records show "Strong came out in a violent speech in opposition to negro suffrage," saying "that he was teetotally opposed to negro suffrage in any manner or form that could be devised."  Strong was selected as the Democratic nominee for the election of a Wisconsin delegate to Congress.  He was defeated by John Hubbard Tweedy in the general election, 9,648 to 10,670.

Once Wisconsin became a state in 1848, Strong was elected to the Wisconsin State Assembly for the 1850 session, where he served as Speaker.

In the 1850s, Strong assisted Byron Kilbourn in his efforts to promote the proposed La Crosse and Milwaukee Railroad.  Although Strong lived in Mineral Point, Kilbourn arranged to have him elected to the Wisconsin State Assembly in 1857 as a representative for Milwaukee County so that Strong could help convince the state legislature to help out the effort.  In the end, Strong became very involved in efforts to bribe legislators.  When elected officials attempted to investigate in 1858, Strong refused to testify before legislative committees, and spent six days in jail.  The Wisconsin Supreme Court, in In re Falvey, 7 Wis. 630 (1858). rejected his argument that legislative committees do not have the power to issue subpoenas.

In the 1870s, Strong wrote a history of the Wisconsin Territory entitled History of the Territory of Wisconsin from 1836 to 1848. He convinced the state legislature to publish the work in 1885.

In 1878, Strong helped to organize the State Bar of Wisconsin, and was elected its first president.  He served in that role until 1893.

Strong died in Mineral Point in 1894. The Wisconsin Magazine of History in 1955 judged that "An independent attitude coupled with a love of gambling, excessive drinking, and a limited business ability combined to keep Strong from reaching his goals."

See also
 List of United States attorneys for Wisconsin

References

Further reading
 Cravens, Stanley H. "Capitals and Capitols in Early Wisconsin" in Wisconsin Legislative Reference Bureau. State of Wisconsin 1983-1984 Blue Book. Madison: Author, 1983, pp. 99–170.
 Duckett, Kenneth W. Frontiersman of Fortune: Moses M. Strong of Mineral Point. Madison: State Historical Society of Wisconsin, 1955.
 "Moses Strong". Wisconsin Lawyer http://www.wisbar.org/AM/Template.cfm?Section=Search&template=/CM/HTMLDisplay.cfm&ContentID=35879&
 Schafer, Joseph. "A Yankee Land Speculator in Wisconsin".  Wisconsin Magazine of History, vol. 8, no. 4 (June 1925): 377–392.
 Smith, William R. The History of Wisconsin, Part II: Documentary, Vol. III. Madison, Wis.: Beriah Brown, 1854.
 Strong, Moses M. History of the Territory of Wisconsin from 1836 to 1848. Madison, Wis.: Democrat Printing Co., 1885.
 Watrous, Jerome A. Memoirs of Milwaukee County: From the Earliest Historical Times Down to the Present. Madison, Wis.: Western Historical Association, 1909, p. 164.

External links

1830 births
1894 deaths
Members of the Wisconsin Territorial Legislature
People from Rutland (town), Vermont
People from Mineral Point, Wisconsin
United States Attorneys for the District of Wisconsin
19th-century American politicians
Speakers of the Wisconsin State Assembly
Democratic Party members of the Wisconsin State Assembly